Subhrojit Saha  is an Indian television actor mainly working in the Bengali-language television industry based in Kolkata. He came to prominence by playing the male lead role in the television serial Rakhi Bandhan.

Career
Saha started his acting career with television serial Rakhi Bandhan in which he played the role of Bandhan. After the show went off-air, he was cast to play Jadunath Choudhury, the grandson of Rani Rashmoni in Karunamoyee Rani Rashmoni from 2019 to 2020. He is currently playing Samudra, the male lead in Nayantara (TV series).

References

External links

Living people
Year of birth missing (living people)
Bengali television actors
Indian television actors
21st-century Indian male actors